Mrudula Phadke was the Vice Chancellor of the Maharashtra University of Health Sciences.

References 

Living people
Year of birth missing (living people)
Indian women academics
Heads of universities and colleges in India